Vyasa Vidya Peethom is an educational institution in Palakkad. Following the CBSE syllabus and affiliated to the Vidya Bharati, it is the first educational institution established by the BVN (Bharatheeya Vidya Nikethan) in Kerala. The school has been catering to CBSE syllabus since 1984, recruiting students from states like Manipur and even from the neighbouring nations like Nepal.

Overview 
Inspired by Vidya Bharati, the Bharatheeya Vidya Nikethan (Kerala) entered the field of education by opening its first school at the village of Kallekad in Palakkad district of Kerala. The school is managed by the Vyasa Vidya Peethom Society registered under the provisions of ACT XXI of 1860. The school is on the Palakkad-Shornur road, just 8 km from Palakkad. The school has five blocks and also has a Saraswati temple in its compound. The school has a Yoga hall, auditoriums for various cultural activities & seminars, separate hostels for boys and girls. The campus also has a teachers' training centre, a Multimedia Animation training institute and a Women's Arts College.

See also 
 Palakkad

References 
 Vyasa Vidya Peethom

Vidya Bharati schools
Primary schools in Kerala
High schools and secondary schools in Kerala
Schools in Palakkad
Educational institutions established in 1984
1984 establishments in Kerala
Private schools in Kerala